Ryan Price (born January 12, 1992) is a former American professional soccer player.

Career

Early career
Price played college soccer with Florida Gulf Coast Eagles, Stony Brook Seawolves and Florida Atlantic Owls between 2010 and 2014.

Price also appeared for USL PDL club Floridians FC in 2014.

Professional
Price signed with USL club Tulsa Roughnecks in February 2015. After just one season in professional soccer, Price retired from the game on March 7, 2016.

References

External links 
 Tulsa Roughnecks profile

1992 births
Living people
American soccer players
Florida Gulf Coast Eagles men's soccer players
Stony Brook Seawolves men's soccer players
Floridians FC players
FC Tulsa players
Association football defenders
Soccer players from Florida
USL League Two players
USL Championship players